Almeria (IPA: [ɐlme'ɾiɐ]), officially the Municipality of Almeria (Waray: Bungto han Almeria;), is a 5th class municipality in the province of Biliran, Philippines. According to the 2020 census, it has a population of 17,954 people.

Geography

According to the Philippine Statistics Authority, the municipality has a land area of  constituting  of the  total area of Biliran.

Barangays
Almeria is politically subdivided into 13 barangays.

Climate

Demographics

In the 2020 census, Almeria had a population of 17,954.

Economy

Government

List of Mayors

 Fructosa A. Victorioso — Mayor (Appointed) 1948-1949
 Jose K. Vero — Acting Mayor 1949-1951
 Elias G. Morillo — 1952-1955
 Victorino A. Jaguros — 1956-1959
 Jose K. Vero — 1964-1967
 Victorino A. Jaguros — 1968-1971
 Victorino A. Jaguros — 1972-1977
 Florentino S. Quijano — Acting Mayor from 1978 to 1979
 Simforosa R. Jaguros — Appointed Mayor (part of 1979, part of 1980)
 Florentino S. Quijano — 1980-1986
 Jose E. Victorioso — (Officer in Charge) 1986-1987
 Florentino S. Quijano — (Officer in Charge) 1987-1988
 Supremo T. Sabitsana — 1988-1992
 Supremo T. Sabitsana — 1992-1995
 Supremo T. Sabitsana — 1995-1998
 Antonio Agajan — 1998-2001
 Rolando E. Ty — 2001

References

External links
 [ Philippine Standard Geographic Code]
 BiliranIsland.com

Municipalities of Biliran